Daryl Dolynny (born 1966) is a former Canadian politician, who was elected to the Legislative Assembly of the Northwest Territories in the 2011 election. He represented the electoral district of Range Lake.

A pharmacist, Dolynny operated a Shoppers Drug Mart franchise in Yellowknife prior to his election to the legislature.

Dolynny is of French and Ukrainian descent.

References

External links
Daryl Dolynny campaign page

Living people
Members of the Legislative Assembly of the Northwest Territories
People from Yellowknife
Franco-Ténois people
Canadian people of Ukrainian descent
Canadian pharmacists
1966 births